Scuba Dice EP 2 is the second EP by the Irish pop punk band Scuba Dice.  It was the band's first release of new material since leaving You're a Star and marked the start of the band embarking on an originals-only career, and are the last recordings with Sean and Spud in the band. Shortly after these songs were recorded, Spud left the band, forcing Liam Byrne to take his place.

Track listing
As The: Nothin's Free (Limited Edition) Ep
 "Nothin's Free" – 2:42
 "Made(Single Version)" – 3:32
 "16! Mandatory" – 3:19
 "Just Dance" – 3:26
 "Hear Me Out" – 2:52
 "Bitter Sweet" – 3:03

As: The Pink Ep
 "Made(Single Version)" – 3:32
 "16! Mandatory" – 3:19
 "Just Dance" – 3:26
 "Hear Me Out" – 2:52
 "Bitter Sweet" – 3:03
 "Sticky Woo" – 4:03

As: Demo 3
 "Just Dance"
 "Bitter Sweet"
 "16 Mandatory"
 "Hear Me Out"

Personnel
 Joe Grace – Vocals
 Padraig 'Scanner' King – Guitar
 Eoin 'Spud' Murphy – Bass, Backing vocals
 Sean Savage - Drums, Backing vocals

References

Scuba Dice albums
2008 EPs